Bocaranga is a sub-prefecture in the prefecture of Ouham-Pendé in Central African Republic. The city must not be confused with Bocaranga I, Bocaranga II, Bocaranga III and Bocaranga IV. These are smaller villages along the road from Bocaranga to Bouar

History

The village of Bocaranga was ceded to German Kamerun on 4 November 1911. It went back to French Oubangi-Chari rule in 1914. In 1946 it became a district and on January 23, 1961 it became a sous-préfecture within the newly independent Central African Republic.

Civil war 
On 23 September 2017 Bocaranga was captured by 3R rebels from Anti-balaka. It was recaptured by government forces on 7 January 2019.

Geography and climate
The city is located in the highlands of the northwest part of the country. It is surrounded by granite hills and rocks. Northwest of the city is Mount Bocaranga (1309 m), which is one of the highest points in the country.

Köppen-Geiger climate classification system classifies its climate as tropical wet and dry (Aw).

Transport
There is an airstrip outside town, Bocaranga Airport.
The roads leading to Bocaranga are unpaved.

Notes and references

Sub-prefectures of the Central African Republic
Populated places in Ouham-Pendé